Arnold Levin is an American cartoonist whose work has appeared in The New Yorker and elsewhere.

Awards
He received the National Cartoonist Society Gag Cartoon Award for 1991 and 1992.

External links
NCS Awards
 Arnold Levin's biography at the NCS site

Living people
Year of birth missing (living people)
American cartoonists